The roadstead of Lorient is a roadstead located to the west of Morbihan in Brittany, France.

Geography 
The harbor of Lorient constitutes the mouths of the rivers Blavet, Scorff and the Ter in the Atlantic Ocean. It has several port facilities, including marinas but also the infrastructure of the Lorient Submarine Base. Oriented northeast-southwest, it has an island in its center, Île Saint-Michel, and communicates with the Atlantic Ocean to the south by two passes, the Passe du Sud and the Passe de l'Ouest, separated by reefs. Its northern part is more specifically called the harbor of Pen-Mané while that to the south is called the harbor of Port-Louis.

It is bordered to the west by the communes of Larmor-Plage, Lorient and Lanester and to the east by those of Kervignac, Locmiquélic, Port-Louis and Gâvres.

Port facilities

Lorient 

 Lorient Submarine Base
 : the second-largest fishing port in France in tonnage and first in added value. 27,000 tons per year, 3,000 direct jobs including 700 on board and 130 boats registered in the port of Lorient.
 Port of Kergroise: second-largest port in Brittany, 2.6 million tonnes per year (as of 2021) including petroleum products, animal feed, sand, containers.
 Passenger port: more than 457,500 passages per year to the islands of Groix and Belle-Île-en-Mer.
 Marina: 370 pontoon berths in the port of Lorient.

Larmor-Plage 

 Kernevel marina (1,000 berths)

Locmiquélic 

 Marinas (Sainte-Catherine and Pen Mané)
 Fishing port

Port-Louis 

 Marina (450 berths)
 Fishing port

Gâvres 

 Marina (57 berths)

Wrecks 

References 

Geography of Morbihan
Roadsteads of France
Lorient